Bouchercon, the Anthony Boucher Memorial World Mystery Convention, is an annual convention of creators and devotees of mystery and detective fiction.  It is named in honour of writer, reviewer, and editor Anthony Boucher, and pronounced the way he pronounced his name, rhyming with "voucher".

It is held annually in Autumn, each year being hosted in a different city by a different group of volunteers. The convention typically starts on Thursday and finishes on Sunday.

Each year, Bouchercon nominates and votes the Anthony Awards for excellence in crime fiction, including:  Best Novel, Best First Novel, Best Short Story, Best Critical Non-Fiction, and Best Paperback Original.

People who attend are fans, authors, agents, booksellers, publishers and other people who read and enjoy mystery and crime fiction.  The first one was held in Santa Monica, California in 1970. The guest of honor was Robert Bloch of Psycho fame.

Registered attendees of each Bouchercon are designated as 'members', and vote at the annual business meeting (held during the convention) on necessary business items.  Bouchercon's governing body is its standing committee, which changes year to year, being made up of people who have hosted and will host the convention, and three at large members who are elected by the membership.

Awards

The Anthony Awards are literary awards for mystery writers presented at the Bouchercon World Mystery Convention since 1986. The awards are named for Anthony Boucher (1911–1968), one of the founders of the Mystery Writers of America.

List of Bouchercons

References

 
Mystery fiction
Fan conventions
Recurring events established in 1970
Anthony Boucher